Selman Mesbeh  (Arabic:سلمان مصباح) is a Qatari football defender who played for Qatar in the 2004 Asian Cup. He also played for Al Rayyan, Umm Salal, Qatar SC.

External links

FootballDatabase Profile
11v11 Profile

Qatari footballers
1980 births
Living people
Al-Rayyan SC players
Umm Salal SC players
Qatar SC players
Muaither SC players
Qatar Stars League players
Qatari Second Division players
Association football defenders
Qatar international footballers